Fox's Peter Pan and the Pirates (known in international markets as 20th Century Fox's Peter Pan & the Pirates) is an American animated television series based on J.M. Barrie's Peter Pan that aired on Fox Kids from September 8, 1990, to September 10, 1991. 65 episodes were produced. The show was one of Fox's first forays into programming for children.

Ownership of the series passed to Disney in 2001 when Disney acquired Fox Kids Worldwide.

Characters

Protagonists
 Peter Pan (voiced by Jason Marsden) - The protagonist of the series and the leader of his group.
 Tinker Bell (voiced by Debi Derryberry) - A fairy and Peter Pan's sidekick. Her fairy dust allows humans to fly, but has other abilities, like making fire or light.
 Wendy Darling (voiced by Christina Lange) - the oldest of the Darling siblings.
 John Darling (voiced by Jack Lynch) - The middle Darling sibling.
 Michael Darling (voiced by Whit Hertford) - the youngest of the Darling siblings.
 The Lost Boys - A group of six boys who got orphaned or lost. They only remember their life in Neverland. Their clothes are informal and they all wear caps shaped from various animal heads.

Antagonists
 Captain James Algernon Cloudesley Hook (voiced by Tim Curry) - The main antagonist of the series and Peter Pan's nemesis. He is the captain of his pirate crew. His right hand is missing and he has a sharp iron hook in its place. Despite his fears of being killed and eaten by the crocodile, he does not fear death by any other means.
 Smee (voiced by Ed Gilbert) - Captain Hook's first mate.
 Short Tom - A malicious parrot and Captain Hook's pet who wears an eyepatch. He is capable of speaking, but is limited to phrases taught to him.
 The Jolly Roger Crew - A group of pirates, several aged, whose home address is the Jolly Roger. 
 The Croc - A large reptile that devoured Captain Hook's hand. She lives in her cave shaped like a crocodile's head and a ticking clock is heard every time the Croc is near.

Other characters
 The Indians - A tribe of Native Americans who reside in Neverland and often help out Peter Pan and the Lost Boys. Only three of them figure prominently in the series.
 The Mermaids - A group of young women, who are half human-fish hybrids. They live in the Mermaids' Lagoon. 
 Captain Patch (voiced by Ed Gilbert) – Jasper Hook is the older brother of James Hook who once served as his midshipman. 
 Alde Baran - A white dwarf who works with miniature-horses and has magical boots.
 Olook - A troll who lives in a large cave with a secret entrance.

Differences
Differences from J.M. Barrie's book or other adaptations of Peter Pan include:
 
 This series does not feature an introduction to the Darling family, who lives in the real world in the European city of London, nor states how Peter takes Wendy to Neverland.  
 There is no statement of how the lost boys came to Neverland.
 There is no ending so the ultimate fate of the Lost Boys is unknown, if they get adopted by the Darling parents or stay in Neverland.
 Tinker Bell speaks the same language as the other characters, not a tinkling of bells.
 Captain Hook does not panic when hearing the ticking of a clock.
 The twins are not identical.
 The Lost Boys wear normal clothes and caps from animals' heads.
 In the other adaptations, in Neverland, only Peter is well known for his flying abilities. In this version, the Darling siblings and the Lost Boys can fly all the time.

Episodes

Crew
 Michael Bell - Voice Director
 Lee Dannacher - Voice Director
 Tony Pastor - Voice Director

Broadcast
The series originally aired on Fox from September 8, 1990, to September 10, 1991. Reruns continued to air until September 11, 1992. A rerun of the series' Christmas episode aired on December 25, 1993. The series was then on Fox in a rerun form on weekday mornings from November 4, 1996, to March 28, 1997. Reruns were then shown on Fox Family in 1998.

Before the series was even broadcast, on July 9, 1990, Fox made a presentation to approximately 225 television writers about the their upcoming Fall season line-up. The writers were particularly proud of this series.

Home releases

VHS

Select episodes from the series were released on video in 1992.  Titles included:

United States

United Kingdom

DVD
Select episodes were released on a single DVD for the UK market in 2004.  Episodes released included:

Video game
A video game titled Peter Pan and the Pirates was released for the Nintendo Entertainment System by third -arty publisher THQ. The game was generally received poorly by critics.

In this single player side-scrolling action game, the player controlled Peter Pan, who could collect bags of fairy dust to fly and wielded a sword that boasted a short range. The player began out in the forest and was required to destroy all the pirates in each level to advance to the next, with the last goal of reaching the pirate ship and battling Captain Hook.

Comics
In addition to the TV show a German imprint Bastei-Verlag, inter alia with the Turkish comic book artist Yalaz, released seven comics. They are originally in German and tell new stories of the Fox's Peter Pan and his closest friends.

Titles
The main titles of the comics and their stories, all with English translation:

1. Rettung für das Einhorn – Peter saves the Unicorn
 Ein Piratenschiff geht fliegen – A Pirates' Ship takes Flight (note: a remake from the episode "The Rake")
 Sturm über dem Niemalsland – Stormy Neverland
 Tinkerbell sitzt in der Falle – Tink is trapped
2. Das tickende Krokodil – The tickling Croc
 Wer andern eine Grube gräbt ...  – Who digs a pit for others ... 
 Die Jagd nach dem goldenen Stein – Hunting the golden Stone
 Captain Hook geht baden – Captain Hook goes swimming
3. Captain Hook und der Zauberring – Captain Hook and the Magic Ring
 Captain Hook und der Zauberring – Captain Hook and the Magic Ring
 Angeltour mit Hindernissen – Go fishing with obstacles
 Reise in die Vergangenheit – Journey to the Past
 Die verzauberte Statue – The enchanted Statue
4. Die Hexe mit dem grünen Daumen – The Witch with the green Thumb
 Die Hexe mit dem grünen Daumen – The Witch with the green Thumb
 Alles wegen Ingwerbeeren – All 'coz of the Ginger Berries
 Verrat im Nilpferdreich – Betrayal at the Hippopo-Empire
 Tootles auf Abwegen – Tootles goes astray
 Der falsche Peter – The wrong Peter
5. Die Hexe lässt das Blitzen nicht – The Witch who did not stop Lightning
 Die Hexe lässt das Blitzen nicht – The Witch who did not stop Lightning
 Der Heiratsschwindler – The Wedding Swindler
 Captain Hook hat Schwein – Hook and his Guinea Pigs
 Ein Pirat und ein Gentleman – A Pirate and a Gentleman
 Zaubern will gelernt sein – Doing Magic is to be learned
6. Ein Ehrengast zieht Leine – A Special Guest goes away
 Ein Ehrengast zieht Leine – A Special Guest goes away
 Ein Monstervogel muckt auf – Rebel of a Monster Bird
 Der Piratenausverkauf – Pirates' Sale
 Captain Hook geht in die Falle – Hook gets trapped
 Eis und heiß im Niemalsland – Hot'n Cold in Neverland
7. Viel Radau beim Mädchenklau – Making this much Noise, the Girl has no Choice
 Viel Radau beim Mädchenklau – Making this much Noise, the Girl has no Choice (note: story without Hook)
 Ein Möhrchen zum anbeißen – To get a Nibble from the Carrot
 Der Stein der vom Himmel fiel – The Stone from Sky (note: story without Hook)
 Rettung für die Streithähne – Rescue of the Squabblers
 Freitag der dreizehnte – Friday the Thirteenth (note: not to be mistaken with the episode from the series)

See also

 Peter Pan

Notes

References

External links
 
 

1990s American animated television series
1990 American television series debuts
1991 American television series endings
American children's animated fantasy television series
American television shows based on children's books
Fox Broadcasting Company original programming
Fox Kids
Peter Pan television series
Television series by 20th Century Fox Television
Television series by Endemol Australia
Television series by Saban Entertainment
Television shows adapted into comics
Television shows adapted into video games
Television series about pirates
TMS Entertainment